Tipaza or Tipasa (Tibaza, older Tefessedt) is a province (wilaya) on the coast of Algeria, Its capital is Tipaza, 50 km west of the capital of Algeria.

History
The province was created from Blida Province in 1984.

Administrative divisions
The province is divided into 10 districts (daïras), which are further divided into 28 communes or municipalities.

Districts

 Ahmer El Aïn
 Bou Ismaïl
 Cherchell
 Damous
 Fouka
 Gouraya
 Hadjout
 Koléa
 Sidi Amar
 Tipaza

Communes

 Aghbal
 Ahmar El Ain
 Ain Tagourait
 Attatba
 Beni Milleuk
 Bou Ismaïl
 Bouharoun
 Bourkika
 Chaiba
 Cherchell
 Damous
 Douaouda
 Fouka
 Gouraya
 Hadjeret Ennous
 Hadjout
 Khemisti
 Kolea
 Larhat
 Menaceur
 Messelmoun
 Meurad
 Nador
 Sidi Amar
 Sidi Ghiles
 Sidi Rached
 Sidi Semiane
 Tipaza

References

External links

 
Provinces of Algeria
States and territories established in 1984